The sixth season of the One Piece anime series, split into two "Sky Island" chapters, was produced by Toei Animation, and directed by Konosuke Uda based on Eiichiro Oda's manga by the same name. It was licensed by Funimation as the first season after 4Kids Entertainment dropped their heavily edited dubbing. The sixth season deals primarily with the Straw Hat Pirates's exploration of the legendary Skypiea, a land of winged humanoids built upon clouds, where they face off against Eneru and his henchmen.

The sixth season originally ran from February 9, 2003 through June 13, 2004 on Fuji TV and contained 52 episodes. The English version ran from September 29, 2007 through March 15, 2008 on Cartoon Network, airing just the first 24 in the US. Australia, however, continued to air new episodes and concluded the season on November 3, 2008 to January 9, 2009. English broadcasts of the season used the name translations established by 4Kids for the first 31 episodes; episodes 32 onward, and Home Media releases of the entire season, use Funimation's uncut naming scheme instead.

The season uses six pieces of theme music: two opening themes and four ending themes. The opening theme  by The Babystars in Japanese and Vic Mignogna in English is used until episode 168, followed by "Bon Voyage" by Bon-Bon Blanco for the rest of the season. Funimation's dub uses English versions of these songs.


Episode list

Home releases

Japanese

English 
In North America, this season was recategorized as the majority of "Season Three" for its DVD release by Funimation Entertainment. The Australian Season Three sets were renamed Collection 12 through 15.

Notes

References 

2003 Japanese television seasons
2004 Japanese television seasons
One Piece seasons
One Piece episodes